The 47th Wisconsin Infantry Regiment was a volunteer infantry regiment that served in the Union Army during the American Civil War.

Service
The 47th Wisconsin was organized at Madison, Wisconsin, and mustered into Federal service on February 27, 1865, arriving at Louisville, Kentucky, on February 28.  They then travelled to Nashville, then Tullahoma, Tennessee, at the junction of the McMinnville and Manchester Railroad with the Nashville and Chattanooga Railroad.  They remained here on guard duty until August, when they returned to Nashville where they were mustered out.  

The regiment returned to Madison, Wisconsin, on September 4, 1865, where they were paid and disbanded.

Casualties
The 47th Wisconsin suffered 39 enlisted men who died of disease, for a total of 39 fatalities.

Commanders
 Colonel George Clay Ginty

Notable people
 Nels Anderson, 1st Lt. of Co. D, later a Wisconsin state legislator.
 Charles H. Baxter, Captain of Co. K, later a Wisconsin state legislator.
 Thomas J. Shear, later a Wisconsin state legislator.
 William Young, Captain of Co. A, later a Wisconsin state legislator.

See also

 List of Wisconsin Civil War units
 Wisconsin in the American Civil War

References

The Civil War Archive

Further reading
 

Military units and formations established in 1865
Military units and formations disestablished in 1865
Units and formations of the Union Army from Wisconsin
1865 establishments in Wisconsin